Call of Duty: Black Ops is a 2010 first-person shooter game developed by Treyarch and published by Activision. It was released worldwide in November 2010 for the PlayStation 3, Wii, Windows, and Xbox 360, with a separate version for Nintendo DS developed by n-Space. Aspyr later released the game for OS X in September 2012. It is the seventh title in the Call of Duty series and a successor to Call of Duty: World at War.

Set in the 1960s during the Cold War, the game's campaign follows CIA operative Alex Mason as he attempts to recall certain memories of combat to locate a numbers station. This station is due to transmit broadcasts to sleeper agents instructing them to deploy chemical weapons across the United States. Mason and CIA operative Jason Hudson are the game's main playable characters, as well as Red Army soldier Viktor Reznov in one mission. Locations featured in the game include Cuba, Laos, Vietnam, the Soviet Union, the United States, Hong Kong, and the Arctic Circle. The multiplayer component of Black Ops features multiple objective-based game modes that are playable on 14 different maps included with the game. Improvements to loadout options and killstreak rewards are made. A form of virtual currency, COD Points, allows players to purchase weapons and customization options for their in-game character, as well as attachments and customization options for their weapon.

Development for the game began in 2009. It runs an enhanced version of the IW 3.0 engine used in World at War. The improvements made allowed for bigger campaign levels to be made as well as enhanced lighting. Treyarch focused specifically on Black Ops during development; they were developing two games at once while making World at War. Different teams within the company focused on a certain game mode. Music was composed by Sean Murray, with music by The Rolling Stones, Creedence Clearwater Revival, Eminem, and Avenged Sevenfold appearing in the game. The marketing of the game began in April 2010.

The game received generally positive reviews from critics with praise for its story, voice-acting, darker tone and multiplayer modes, although some criticized it for its lack of innovation, linear gameplay, and technical issues. Among other awards and nominations, Call of Duty: Black Ops was nominated Game of the Year by numerous media outlets and award shows, including the Interactive Achievement Awards, British Academy Games Awards, and Spike Video Game Awards. Within 24 hours of going on sale, the game had sold more than 5.6 million copies, breaking the record set by its predecessor Modern Warfare 2 by some 2.3 million copies. The game had sold over 25 million copies worldwide, making it one of the best-selling games of all time. A sequel, Call of Duty: Black Ops II, was released in 2012. Call of Duty: Black Ops Cold War, set between Black Ops and Black Ops II, was released in November 2020.

Gameplay
Black Ops is a first-person shooter, retaining the same gameplay mechanics as previous Call of Duty titles. The player assumes the role of a foot soldier who can wield various firearms (only two of which can be carried at once), throw grenades and other explosives, and use other equipment as weapons. A player close enough to an enemy can kill with one knife blow. A character can take three stances: standing, crouching, or prone. Each affects the rate of movement, accuracy, and stealth. The player can drop to the prone stance from the standing stance while running (colloquially known as "dolphin diving"), and can momentarily sprint before having to stop. The screen glows red to indicate damage to a player's health, which regenerates over time. When the character is within the blast radius of a live grenade, an on-screen marker indicates where it is in relation to the player, helping the player to move away or to throw it back. Among the weapons new to the series in Black Ops are crossbows with bolts and explosive ammunition, Dragon's Breath rounds and ballistic knives.

The player assumes the role of various characters during the single-player campaign, changing perspectives throughout the story. The playable characters are covert operatives conducting black operations behind enemy lines. Each mission features a series of objectives that are displayed on the heads-up display, which marks the direction and distance towards and from such objectives as it has been in the earlier versions. The player is accompanied by friendly troops throughout the game. Although primarily a first-person shooter, certain levels feature sequences where the player pilots a Hind helicopter and guides friendly troops from a SR-71 Blackbird reconnaissance aircraft. The campaign features several scripted cinematic moments. One of them is a bullet time effect during the "Victor Charlie" level, activated when the player fires toward the last enemy of a Viet Cong squad.

Multiplayer

The online multiplayer mode of Black Ops usually revolves around two teams on a specific mission. For example, in Team Deathmatch the team with the most kills wins, while in Capture the Flag, players take the other team's flags and return it to their base. Additionally, there is Free For All in which players are not separated into teams. Not including Downloadable maps, there are 14 different maps.

Black Ops retains the experience points and unlockable reward system that has been kept since Call of Duty 4. The multiplayer focuses on socialization and customization. "Create-a-Class 2.0" allows enhanced personalization with appearance items as well as upgradable perks; weapons are extensively customizable with writing, emblems, attachments, and camouflage painting. Even reticles can be modified. There is more than one style for an attachment, which allows for a lot more personalized weaponry; for example, the player can choose between a red dot sight or a reflex sight, both of which share many of the same traits, although the red dot fills up less of the screen (something desired by many players). Character models depend on the first tier perk instead of the weapon's type. Furthermore, face paints can be unlocked. New custom killstreak rewards include explosive R/C cars, guided missiles, and controllable attack helicopters.

A currency system has been implemented allowing players to buy weapons, accessories, and clothes. Players can gamble with their "COD Points" in a free-for-all based playlist called "Wager Match", which is composed of four game modes. Time-limited objectives known as "Contracts" can be purchased to gain more currency and experience points. The progression system is not featured in the local split-screen multiplayer. In the local split-screen play, all character customization options are already unlocked. Players can no longer define game rules such as win conditions.

Players can play alone or with friends against AI opponents in "Combat Training" with a separate progression system. Online split-screen is re-introduced on Xbox 360 and PS3. The guest account can rank up but is reset after each sign out. Only on Xbox 360, a second Gold Xbox Live account can be used to keep the second player's progression. Aside from the Combat Training mode, Xbox users can also have up to four players in split-screen mode play against AI opponents even without having an Xbox Live account. This is done by configuring the Local Split Screen settings and setting the number of enemies to a value greater than zero.

For the first time in the series, clips from online gameplay can be recorded. Some specific features that have been removed from the PC version of Infinity Ward's Modern Warfare 2 return, such as lean, mod tools, the developer console, and dedicated servers. Dedicated servers are exclusively provided by Game Servers. Steam is the exclusive platform for Black Ops on PC, and the game is protected by Valve Anti-Cheat.

The Wii version of the game includes in-game voice chat. This is the first Call of Duty title to include the voice chat feature for the Wii. Nintendo and PDP have partnered to release the first headset to be used with the Wii known as PDP's Headbanger Headset.

Zombies

A zombie cooperation mode, titled "Zombies", is included in the game. Originally featured in World at War, it was revamped to be included in Black Ops. It is a four-player online and two-player split screen co-op mode (which can also be unlocked online). The game features three maps, "Five", Kino Der Toten, and the unlockable Dead Ops Arcade. "Five" takes place in The Pentagon during a chain of events that differ from the storyline of the campaign mode. The playable characters, John F. Kennedy, Richard Nixon, Robert McNamara, and Fidel Castro are interrupted from negotiations by an outbreak of zombies. Kino Der Toten takes place in an abandoned Group 935 facility located within a theater in Berlin during 1963. The playable characters in this map return from the World at War Zombies mode: Edward Richtofen, a mad German scientist, Takeo Masaki, an officer of the Imperial Japanese Army, Nikolai Belinski, a Red Army soldier, and Tank Dempsey, a Marine from the United States. Dead Ops Arcade is an unlockable game mode that the player can unlock by typing "DOA" within the data terminal of the main menu. Once unlocked, the player is transferred to play a retro arcade version of the main zombie's game mode. New elements like extra lives, unique mini maps, and zombie bosses are present within the game mode. Dead Ops Arcade includes co-op playthrough through either Xbox Live or split screen of up to 4 players.

Plot

Campaign

Characters and setting

Black Ops takes place between 1961 and 1968 during both the Cold War and the Vietnam War, 16 years to 23 years after the events of World at War. It portrays a secret history of CIA clandestine black operations carried out behind enemy lines. Missions take place in various locations around the globe, such as the Ural Mountains, Kazakhstan, Cuba, Hong Kong, Laos, South Vietnam, the Arctic Circle and Siberia. The single-player campaign revolves around an experimental nerve agent and chemical weapon codenamed "Nova 6". This weapon is bound to be used by covert sleeper agents in the United States, who are programmed to carry out their orders once broadcasts are transmitted from an unknown numbers station.

The player controls the protagonist, CIA SAD/SOG operative and former U.S. Marine Force Recon Captain Alex Mason (Sam Worthington). Occasionally, CIA paramilitary operations officer Jason Hudson (Ed Harris) and some other characters are playable to progress the story. Alex is often joined by fellow operatives Force Recon Master Sergeant Frank Woods (James C. Burns) and Navy UDT Chief Joseph Bowman (Ice Cube), while Hudson teams up with Grigori Weaver (Gene Farber), a Russian-born field operative. Viktor Reznov (Gary Oldman), a key character from the Soviet campaign in World at War, returns along with that game's Russian protagonist Dimitri Petrenko (Boris Kievsky) also making an appearance. Oldman also voices Daniel Clarke, a British scientist assisting in the development of Project Nova. Opposing the CIA are the leaders of Project Nova: former Red Army General Nikita Dragovich (Eamon Hunt), Colonel Lev Kravchenko (Andrew Divoff), and former Nazi scientist Doctor Friedrich Steiner (Mark Bramhall). Black Ops also features several historical figures; during the story, Mason meets John F. Kennedy, Robert McNamara, and Fidel Castro.

Story
In April 1961, Mason, Woods, and Bowman partake in Operation 40 to assassinate Fidel Castro and assist the CIA-sponsored Cuban exiles during the Bay of Pigs Invasion. Mason shoots Castro's body double and stays behind, allowing Woods and Bowman to flee in an extraction plane. He is captured by the real Castro, who hands him to the Soviet Union. Imprisoned at Vorkuta Gulag, Mason befriends former Red Army soldier Viktor Reznov. Reznov gives Mason the identities of their enemies: Major General Nikita Dragovich, Colonel Lev Kravchenko, and ex-Nazi scientist Friedrich Steiner, who defected to the Soviet Union. In October 1945, Reznov,  Dimitri Petrenko, and their platoon were sent to extract Steiner from a Nazi base in the Arctic. However, they were betrayed by Dragovich, who tested Steiner's nerve gas "Nova 6" on Petrenko and his squad, killing them. Reznov was spared when British commandos, interested in acquiring Nova 6, attacked. He destroyed Nova 6 and escaped, only to be captured by the Soviets and sent to Vorkutlag. The Soviets later recreated Nova 6 using British scientist Daniel Clarke.

By 1963, Mason and Reznov spark an uprising to flee the prison; Reznov stays behind to facilitate Mason's escape. In November, President John F. Kennedy authorizes a mission to assassinate Dragovich. Mason, Woods, Bowman, and CIA agent Weaver are dispatched to the Baikonur Cosmodrome to disrupt the Soviet space program and eliminate members of "Ascension," a Soviet program giving sanctuary to Nazi scientists. The team destroys the Soyuz spacecraft, while Dragovich is seemingly killed in a car explosion.

In January 1968, Mason's team is sent to Vietnam as part of MACV-SOG. After defending Khe Sanh from a North Vietnamese assault, they recover a dossier on Dragovich from a Russian defector being held by the North Vietnamese Army in Hue City during the Tet Offensive; the defector is revealed to be Reznov. After Dragovich resurfaces, they penetrate Laos to recover a Nova 6 shipment from a downed Soviet plane. They are captured by Viet Cong and Spetznaz forces at the crash site. Bowman is executed, but Woods and Mason escape, hijacking a Mi-24 Hind and crippling a part of the Ho Chi Minh trail before rescuing Reznov from Kravchenko's base. They confront Kravchenko, but he primes grenades strapped to his body, forcing Woods to push himself and Kravchenko out of a window; Mason presumes the two dead.

Hudson and Weaver interrogate Clarke in Kowloon City. Clarke reveals the location of a facility in Mount Yamantau before being killed by Dragovich's men. Hudson and Weaver destroy the facility and receive a transmission from Steiner requesting to meet at Rebirth Island, as Dragovich will kill him next. Mason and Reznov, meanwhile, head there to assassinate Steiner, succeeding as Hudson and Weaver arrive. Hudson and Weaver witness Mason carrying out the act alone while declaring himself Reznov, prompting the pair to interrogate him; it is revealed that Mason is hallucinating a string of randomized numbers.

Dragovich has sleeper cells placed within each State capital, which, when ordered by a broadcast of the numbers from his station, will release Nova 6. In response, the U.S., now at DEFCON 2, is preparing a pre-emptive nuclear strike on the Soviet Union. Hudson reveals that Mason was brainwashed by Dragovich at Vorkuta to serve as a Soviet sleeper agent and assassinate Kennedy. Reznov died during the breakout, and the Soviet defector was killed; Mason's visions of Reznov are an illusion caused by the brainwashing. Prior to his death, Reznov reprogrammed Mason to assassinate Dragovich, Kravchenko, and Steiner. Mason remembers the location of Dragovich's broadcast station is a Russian ship named Rusalka off the coast of Cuba. An assault on the Rusalka begins, with the United States Navy called in to destroy it. Mason and Hudson confront Dragovich in the underwater submarine base protecting the ship, with Mason drowning Dragovich. He escapes with Hudson, and they join Weaver and the Navy.

Footage of President Kennedy before his assassination on November 22, 1963, is shown, revealing Mason was among onlookers who watched him arrive at Love Field, suggesting Mason may have carried out his initial programming.

Zombies

Characters and settings
The Zombies story takes place over various eras of time, mostly during the final year of World War II and the 1960s. The story mainly follows four soldiers: "Tank" Dempsey (Steve Blum) of the United States Marine Corps, Nikolai Belinski (Fred Tatasciore) of the Red Army, Takeo Masaki (Tom Kane) of the Imperial Japanese Army, and Doctor Edward Richtofen (Nolan North) of the Wehrmacht. Other characters include Doctor Ludvig Maxis (Fred Tatasciore) and his daughter Samantha (Julie Nathanson). The map "Five" features historical figures: John F. Kennedy (Jim Meskimen), Robert McNamara (Robert Picardo), Richard Nixon (Dave Mallow), and Fidel Castro (Marlon Correa). "Call of the Dead" features the appearance of celebrities: Sarah Michelle Gellar, Robert Englund, Danny Trejo, Michael Rooker, all playing themselves and George A. Romero.

Story
During World War II, Doctor Ludvig Maxis formed Group 935, a group of scientists intended to improve the human condition. Lacking funds, they soon turned to creating superweapons to aid the Nazis. Their discovery of Element 115 from a meteorite in Japan led to zombies' creation. Maxis and his assistant, Dr. Edward Richtofen, also work on other projects, leading to the creation of teleportation devices and 115-powered weapons. Attempting to use himself as a test subject, Richtofen accidentally teleports to a catacomb within the Moon, where he comes into contact with a mysterious pyramid device that causes him to hear ghostly voices, slowly taking away his sanity. He is later teleported to an exotic jungle known as Shangri-La, where he spends three weeks studying the Vril energy force. Upon returning to Germany, Richtofen secretly forms a plan to kill Maxis and gathers many members of Group 935 to build a Moon base known as Griffin Station. While maintaining his cover with Maxis and the rest of Group 935, Richtofen manages to capture three soldiers: Tank Dempsey, Nikolai Belinski, and Takeo Masaki; he begins to experiment with Element 115, causing memory loss for all three soldiers.

Maxis continues his work on other experiments, attempting to use his daughter's dog, Fluffy, as a test subject for his own teleportation device. However, the experiment fails, and Fluffy is transformed into an undead Hellhound. Richtofen takes the opportunity and traps Maxis and his daughter Samantha inside the teleporter with Fluffy, believing they will die. Richtofen escapes as Der Riese is overrun by zombies with his three captured soldiers and arrives at the Rising Sun research facility in Japan, where Element 115 was first discovered. After gathering a sample of 115 at the site and recovering a weapon known as the Wunderwaffe DG-2, they return to the Der Riese factory in Germany. In an attempt to escape the zombie horde, the group accidentally overloads a teleporter with the DG-2, sending them forward in time. They arrive at an abandoned Nazi theater in the 1960s, where Richtofen discovers several recordings left behind by Dr. Maxis. Samantha, having survived and managing to control the zombies, continues raising the undead to hunt down Richtofen.

In 1963, the United States government manages to grab hold of several of Group 935's inventions, keeping them hidden in the Pentagon. Zombies breach the Pentagon, trapping John F. Kennedy, Richard Nixon, Robert McNamara, and Fidel Castro inside and forcing them to fight their way out. Meanwhile, Richtofen's crew arrives at a Soviet Cosmodrome site, where Richtofen intends to travel to Group 935's Moon base, Griffin Station. The crew is contacted by Gersh, a member of the Ascension Group who requests to be freed from Samantha's grip. After freeing Gersh, the four of them are teleported further in time and arrive at a Siberian lighthouse sometime in 2011, once used by Richtofen as a secret lab. However, they are trapped within a locked room and forced to rely on four movie actors: Sarah Michelle Gellar, Danny Trejo, Robert Englund, and Michael Rooker, who are filming a zombie movie on-site along with director George A. Romero, who had been infected as well. Richtofen requests the four celebrities to find a golden rod, a Vril generator device, which he then uses to fix the teleporter. He transports himself and the other three soldiers back to Shangri-La, leaving the celebrities behind to continue fighting Romero and the horde. At Shangri-La, the group discovers two explorers, Gary and Brock, who died trapped within a time loop while trying to discover the secrets of the mythical Agartha realm. The group saves the explorers' lives by traveling back and forth in time, altering the environments of the temple in the process. They discover an altar within the temple with Richtofen's name written on it and a piece of a meteorite containing Element 115. However, the explorers remain stuck in the never-ending loop.

With the Vril generator and the meteorite piece, Richtofen believes he can control the zombies and returns to Griffin Station. Here, they attempt to activate the MPD, a machine that controls the Aether energy, which opens to reveal Samantha inside; instead of dying by Richtofen's trap, Samantha is teleported to the moon while Maxis is sent somewhere else. Samantha accidentally triggered the MPD and was trapped within the device, but this also allowed her to enter the Aether realm. Maxis, who was retrieved by Group 935 scientists, apologized to his daughter and committed suicide in front of her, prompting her to assume control of the zombies and seek vengeance on Richtofen. Richtofen fuses the golden rod and the meteorite piece and, using it to switch souls with Samantha, takes over as the new zombie controller. This causes his former allies to feel betrayed, and they ally themselves with Samantha (who now resides in Richtofen's body). Maxis is revealed to have become a sentient artificial intelligence living within the systems of Griffin Station, and he guides his daughter and the three soldiers to launch three missiles at the Earth. This severs Richtofen's link with the Aether, but the launch results in the catastrophic destruction of the Earth while still leaving Richtofen in control of the undead.

Development
In May 2009, publisher Activision was rumored to be looking for licensing regarding Vietnam War-era music which led to speculation that Call of Duty 7 would be set in Vietnam. In May 2009, Treyarch employee David Kim revealed on his LinkedIn profile that he would work as a senior animator on Call of Duty 7. In November 2009, only a few days before Modern Warfare 2s release, Activision officially announced a new Call of Duty title for 2010 through their third quarter financial call. In February 2010, a casting call for Call of Duty 7 led to speculation that the game would be taking place during the Cold War era with some battles taking place in South Vietnam. On April 30, 2010, Black Ops was officially announced.

The game runs on an enhanced World at War engine (which itself was improved from Call of Duty 4) at 60 frames per second across all platforms, excluding the Wii. It features a streaming texture technology (also seen in Modern Warfare 2), making bigger levels possible such as "Payback" where the player controls a helicopter. Lighting effects have been improved as well. Call of Duty: Black Ops supports 3-D imaging rendered by the engine itself. This feature is available on the PC, PlayStation 3, and Xbox 360 versions.

For Black Ops, Treyarch focused only on this game unlike past practice. However, it had different teams, each working on separate game modes. Treyarch used a motion capture technology similar to the one used in James Cameron's film Avatar, which allows accurate facial expressions, capturing the whole performance of the actor. The studio also consulted special forces veterans from both belligerents of the Cold War: Major John Plaster (US Army-Ret.) who served in the MACV-SOG during the Vietnam War, and former Soviet special forces operative Sonny Puzikas. The latter taught Treyarch how Spetsnaz soldiers would react in combat, such as rolling out of the line of fire. Spetsnaz AIs in the game have been modeled after him, from his tactics and his movements to his face. Although having a historical background, the classified aspect of these Cold War black operations allowed the studio to create its own fictional story. The game also allows players to turn down the blood and turn off the profanity.

It was announced on November 9, 2015, that Black Ops would become backwards compatible with the Xbox One. It was originally meant to be available for backwards compatibility in December 2015, but the date was later changed to some time in 2016. Black Ops was originally the sixth-most requested Xbox 360 title to become backwards compatible with the Xbox One. On May 17, 2016, the game was made available through Xbox One's backward compatibility. Shortly after, it was reported that sales of the Xbox 360 version had increased by 13,000 percent.

Audio
Black Ops features the voices of Sam Worthington as Alex Mason, Ed Harris as Jason Hudson, Gary Oldman reprises his role as Viktor Reznov from World at War and also voices Dr. Clarke, James C. Burns voices and provides performance capture for Frank Woods and Ice Cube voices Joseph Bowman, whose appearance is likened to him as well, and is also the multiplayer announcer for the SOG faction. Gene Farber voices Grigori Weaver, Emmanuelle Chriqui plays a live-action character called Numbers, Eamon Hunt voices Nikita Dragovich, Andrew Divoff voices Lev Kravchenko and Robert Picardo voices Secretary Robert McNamara. Dimitri Diatchenko, an American born actor and musician voices the Spetsnaz faction and several other characters due to his strong Russian accent.

Call of Duty: Black Ops features Vietnam War era music including "Sympathy for the Devil" by The Rolling Stones (played during a gameplay sequence, the credits, and as an easter egg in the multiplayer map Nuketown) and Creedence Clearwater Revival's "Fortunate Son". Eminem's "Won't Back Down" (featuring Pink) is used for the credits as well, and additionally appears as an Easter Egg in the Zombie map "Five". In the Call of the Dead zombie map the song "Not Ready to Die" by American heavy metal band Avenged Sevenfold is featured as an easter egg. The original music was composed by Sean Murray, who also composed Call of Duty: World at War while Kevin Sherwood composed music for the Zombies mode. The soundtrack was released on November 9. The use of The Rolling Stones' music in the game has seen a significant increase in the band's music sales since launch. "Gimme Shelter" sold 2,000 copies in the week before the launch trailer was revealed, 5,000 the week after, and 11,000 the week after the game's release. "Sympathy for the Devil" experienced a similar boost as gamers discovered the band's music.

The game's score was composed by Sean Murray, and the official soundtrack was released on November 9, 2010. In addition, a soundtrack for the popular Zombies mode was released on January 25, 2011.

Marketing
Black Ops was first officially unveiled when the website for the game went live on April 30, 2010 prior to the release of its debut teaser trailer on GameTrailers TV Episode 310. In early April 2010, an unmarked envelope was sent to various gaming news publications as well as high-profile Call of Duty fans via mail. It contained a USB flash drive with sound and text files. These files were codes to be decrypted, only to find a mysterious teaser site for an unknown game. Other codes were updated periodically.

Similarly to Modern Warfare 2s marketing, the first full-length trailer of Black Ops was aired after the 3rd quarter on ESPN during the NBA Eastern Conference Finals on May 18, 2010. During E3 2010, studio head Mark Lamia opened the Microsoft conference by playing Black Ops on stage. It was also announced that the timed Xbox 360 exclusivity for additional content of Call of Duty titles, which began with Modern Warfare 2, extends until 2012. A remixed version of the ESPN trailer with Eminem's "Won't Back Down" was released on June 14, prior to the E3 Activision conference for which he also performed. A multiplayer teaser trailer was released on August 9, 2010, revealing killstreaks, weapons, and other in-game multiplayer features. A full multiplayer reveal took place on September 1, 2010, and revealed many multiplayer features from the game.

Chrysler produced a limited-edition Call of Duty Jeep as the Wrangler is featured in Black Ops. In late September, viral site GKNOVA6 was updated revealing fuzzy footages of zombies. On October 11, a single player trailer aired on ESPN during the New York Jets versus Minnesota Vikings NFL Monday Night Football game. The same trailer was aired the next day in the United Kingdom at half time of the England versus Montenegro 2012 European Football Championship qualifying game. On October 29, the official launch trailer was released online. The same trailer aired on October 31 during the New Orleans Saints versus Pittsburgh Steelers NFL Sunday Night Football game. The trailer features the song "Gimme Shelter" by The Rolling Stones, and was directed by Rupert Sanders, who later went on to direct Snow White and the Huntsman and Ghost in the Shell.

Retail versions
Like Modern Warfare 2, "Hardened" and "Prestige" limited editions are available: the Hardened Edition includes a SteelBook case, a medal with its display case, four exclusive co-op levels and an Xbox Live or PlayStation Home avatar outfit. The Prestige Edition offers, in addition to the Hardened Edition's content, a real RC-XD remote-control vehicle modeled after the in-game killstreak reward, which gives video and audio feedback to its controller. In Japan, the game is distributed by Square Enix. Two versions are available: subtitled or dubbed, released respectively on November 18, 2010, and December 16, 2010. Both have dismemberment censored. Gore is censored as well in Germany in addition to the removal of "Sympathy for the Devil" and Nazi symbols considered "anti-constitutional" in the country.

Downloadable content
Treyarch released the "First Strike" Map Pack on February 1, 2011, for the Xbox 360. The PlayStation 3 received the map pack on March 3, 2011, and the PC version was released on March 25, 2011, through Steam. The Map Pack includes additional maps that can be played in the multiplayer mode. These maps include "Berlin Wall", "Discovery", "Kowloon" and "Stadium" and a map for the Zombies mode titled "Ascension" which takes place in a Soviet launch site.

On April 11, 2011, a second map pack called "Escalation" was announced by Activison and Microsoft. It features 4 new multiplayer maps named "Zoo", "Hotel", "Convoy", "Stockpile" and one new zombies map named 'Call of the Dead'. This map is based on the movies by George A. Romero, the revolutionary epic-zombie-horror director. The trailer for this map shows the four playable characters: Danny Trejo, Sarah Michelle Gellar, Robert Englund and Michael Rooker. The name is a reference to the immensely popular Dead Series created and directed by Romero. The trailer also offers a sneak peek of a zombiefied version of George A. Romero himself, lurking out of water. The map is set on a ship, with instead of Nazi zombies, shipcrew zombies. It was released on May 3, 2011, for the Xbox 360, June 2 on the PC and June 10 for the PlayStation 3.

A third map pack called "Annihilation" was released for the Xbox 360 on June 28, 2011, and on July 28, 2011, for the PlayStation 3 and PC. It contains four new multiplayer maps named "Hangar 18", "Hazard", "Drive-In", "Silo", and a new zombies map named "Shangri La", which takes place in a legendary shrine lost in an exotic jungle.

The fourth map pack, "Rezurrection" was released on August 23, 2011, for the Xbox 360, and September 22, 2011, on PlayStation 3 and PC. The Rezurrection Map Pack is made up of 5 Zombies mode only maps. It includes the first 4 maps from Call of Duty: World at War ("Shi No Numa"/"Swamp", "Nacht Der Untoten"/"Night", "Verruckt"/"Asylum", "Der Riese"/"Factory") fully remastered. It also includes a new map called "Moon". "Moon" allows players to fight zombies in zero gravity with both the player and the zombies under zero gravity influence.

Reception

Call of Duty: Black Ops received "generally positive" reviews, according to review aggregator Metacritic, except for the DS, where it received "mixed or average" reviews. GameSpot awarded it 9.0 out of ten and wrote "Call of Duty: Black Ops bears the series' standard superbly, delivering an engrossing campaign and exciting competitive multiplayer." Edge magazine was less positive, giving it a 7/10, writing that "As polished and pretty and fun as Black Ops often is, it feels more like a yearly update than a sequel [which] isn't distinct from its predecessors in any important way". Several reviewers also complained that the game felt too much like a rail shooter, with PC Gamer branding it "barely interactive".

Reviewers also noted that the PC version of the game was buggy and had "a number of frustrating problems", including a lag in multiplayer modes which for some players rendered the game almost "unplayable". Players have also reported serious bugs with the PlayStation 3 version, including compatibility issues with 3D televisions. PC World magazine noted that user reviews of the game were much less positive than those of critics. As of November 12, 2010, three days after the release, PC, PS3, and Xbox 360 versions of the game held average user ratings of 3.1, 3.1, and 1.8 stars on Amazon.com, respectively (on a 1 to 5 scale), with many PC users complaining about lag, stuttering and bugs.

In January 2011, to a player complaining about the remaining connection problems for the game on PlayStation 3, an Activision customer service representative threatened that they could shut down the servers for the game for the PlayStation Network at any time. After some days and following some game media heat, Dan Amrich, Activision Social Media Manager, declared that even if they could kill the servers, they did not plan currently to do it.

The Daily Telegraph praised Black Ops as its "meaty kick of the guns, the blistering pace of the action and the sterling soundtrack of explosions, gunshots and whistling bullets all serve to quicken the player's pulse and tighten their grip on the controller", and how the game is "compensated for by [the] nail-shredding tension and creepy atmosphere".

Official Nintendo Magazine awarded the Wii version 90% and said "Black Ops on Wii is a fantastic shooter packed with all the features of its HD brothers, with the only exception being split-screen multiplayer." Martin Gaston at VideoGamer.com gave the Wii version 6 out of 10, complaining of Treyarch's reworking of in-game sequences as movies, poor AI, and gameplay problems from lower-resolution graphics.

In February 2011, the Xbox 360 version was named the Xbox Live's top title of 2010 by GameSpot.

At the 14th Annual Interactive Achievement Awards (now known as the D.I.C.E. Awards), Call of Duty: Black Ops was nominated for "Game of the Year", "Action Game of the Year", "Outstanding Achievement in Animation", "Outstanding Achievement in Online Gameplay", and "Outstanding Achievement in Visual Engineering".

Sales
Within 24 hours of its release, Black Ops had sold 4.2 million copies in the U.S. and 1.4 million copies in the UK, surpassing that of Modern Warfare 2 and establishing a new record for largest entertainment launch. Compared to the much anticipated opening of Harry Potter and the Deathly Hallows – Part 1, the game earned more than twice as much as the film, earning $360 million. Only five days after its release, sales from the game worldwide reached US$650 million, surpassing the previous record achieved by Modern Warfare 2 which earned $550 million in five days. By November 22, the game remained the bestselling title in the United Kingdom, despite sales dropping by 85%. Some estimates had placed sales of the game as reaching 18 million units sold, earning a revenue of $818 million. This would fall about 2 million copies and $182 million short of Modern Warfare 2. By December 22, worldwide revenue of Black Ops exceeded $1 billion. Sales remained strong months after the game's release, remaining at the top-seller list in February 2011. On March 3, 2011, the news magazine The Hollywood Reporter also reported on the best selling video games ever. It announced that Call of Duty: Black Ops was the best-selling game ever in the United States of America. Black Ops was the best-selling game of all time in the UK until Grand Theft Auto V overtook it in November 2014. In August 2011, Activision announced that the game had sold more than 25 million copies. By November 2013, the game had sold 26.2 million copies.

Controversy
Cuba has condemned the game for its depiction of American special forces trying but failing to kill a young Fidel Castro, killing instead a body-double. The Cuba-based pro-Fidel Castro website Cubadebate said the game "encourages sociopathic attitudes of American children and adolescents, the main consumers of these virtual games."

Mobile phone version
Black Ops was also released for both mobile phones and smartphones. This version is a side-scrolling shooter. It features a different storyline, a different set of characters, and is set in the Vietnam War in 1967. The game was developed by Glu Mobile and published by Activision.

Notes

References

External links

2010 video games
Activision games
Fiction about assassinations
Fiction about mind control
Black Ops
Cold War video games
Cooperative video games
Multiplayer and single-player video games
Split-screen multiplayer games
Nintendo DS games
Nintendo Wi-Fi Connection games
MacOS games
PlayStation 3 games
Spy video games
Square Enix games
Treyarch games
Video game sequels
Video games based on the assassination of John F. Kennedy
Video games about mental health
Video games about revenge
Video games scored by Geoff Zanelli
Video games scored by Sean Murray
Video games set in 1945
Video games set in 1961
Video games set in 1963
Video games set in 1968
Alternate history video games
Video games set in Cuba
Video games set in the Soviet Union
Video games set in Virginia
Video games set in Kazakhstan
Video games set in Uzbekistan
Video games set in Vietnam
Video games set in Hong Kong
Video games set in California
Video games set in Ukraine
Video games set in Nevada
Video games set in Antarctica
Video games set in New York City
Video games set in Berlin
Video games set in Laos
Video games set in Poland
Video games set in Canada
Video games set on the Moon
War video games set in the United States
Video games with alternative versions
Video games with stereoscopic 3D graphics
Vietnam War video games
Works about the Cuban Missile Crisis
Wii games
Wii Wi-Fi games
Wii Zapper games
Windows games
Works by David S. Goyer
Xbox 360 games
Video games about the United States Marine Corps
Video games about zombies
Cultural depictions of John F. Kennedy
Cultural depictions of Fidel Castro
Cultural depictions of Richard Nixon
Weapons of mass destruction in fiction
BAFTA winners (video games)
Glu Mobile games
Aspyr games
Video games developed in the United States
Dissociative identity disorder in video games